Thomas Enqvist was the defending champion, but lost in the first round this year.

Thomas Johansson won the tournament, beating Yevgeny Kafelnikov in the final, 6–2, 6–4, 6–4.

Seeds

Draw

Finals

Top half

Bottom half

External links
 Main draw
 Qualifying draw

2000 Stockholm Open
2000 ATP Tour